is a subway station located in Chūō-ku, Fukuoka, Japan. Its station symbol is 5 green dots arranged in a circle, representing a plum blossom, it is Tenmangū (a.k.a.Tenjin)'s symbol. The station is located directly under  in Tenjin, Fukuoka.

Lines

Platforms

Usage 
In 2006 the daily average number of passengers was 63,166. It is the largest Subway Station on the Kūkō Line.

History 
 July 26, 1981 - opening of Tenjin Station

Transfer 
The underground shopping mall can be used for transfer between the Kūkō Line and the Nanakuma Line. To use the same ticket for both lines, passengers must exit through a special gate and enter the gate of the second line within two hours. Therefore, it is no problem to use the transfer time for shopping. If the regular gate is used, a new ticket is required to be purchased. Special tickets can be used for the transfer.

Railway stations in Fukuoka Prefecture
Railway stations in Japan opened in 1981
Railway stations in Fukuoka, Fukuoka